Lasowice Wielkie  / , (1936-45: Oberwalden) is a village in Kluczbork County, Opole Voivodeship, in south-western Poland. It is the seat of the gmina (administrative district) called Gmina Lasowice Wielkie.

In the Upper Silesia plebiscite of 20 March 1921 394 inhabitants (84.2%) voted to remain in Germany, 74 for Poland. Thus Groß Lassowitz remained part of the Weimar Republic.

The village has a population of 764. There is an old wooden church in Lasowice Wielkie from the 16th century. The village is officially bilingual as the majority of its population are Germans. Bilingual signs were installed recently.

References

Villages in Kluczbork County

it:Lasowice Wielkie